This is a list of senior Securitate officers. The General Direction for the Security of the People,  better known by its Romanian abbreviation, Securitate, was officially founded on August 30, 1948 by Decree 221/30. However, it had effectively existed since August 1944, when communists began to infiltrate the Ministry of Internal Affairs on a large scale, with help from SMERSH, an NKVD unit charged with demolishing existing intelligence agencies and replacing them with Soviet-style bodies in the Soviet-occupied countries of Eastern Europe.

From its inception, the Securitate engaged in a terror campaign against "class enemies". The campaign was led from the position of Minister of Interior by Teohari Georgescu in 1948–1952, and Alexandru Drăghici in 1952–1965, seconded in the position of Deputy Interior Minister (until 1960) and Chief of Securitate by Gheorghe Pintilie. Although the largest number of victims was registered between 1948 and 1952, the campaign continued until 1965.

Top leaders

Teohari Georgescu
Gheorghe Pintilie
Alexandru Nicolschi

Mișu Dulgheru
Tudor Sepeanu
Alexandru Drăghici
Serghei Nicolau

Leaders of the Securitate in 1948
In 1948, the Securitate had a personnel of 3,973 of all ranks; of those, 1,151 belonged to the national directorates and 2,822 to the regional directorates.

Top leadership
 Director General: lieutenant general Gheorghe Pintilie
 Deputy Directors: major general Alexandru Nicolschi, major general 
 Registrar Office:
Director: major 
Office Chiefs: captain Dumitru Donescu, captain Emanoil Schmerler
Section Chiefs: captain Nicolae Mateescu, captain Alexandru Jurcă
 Soviet Counselors: Dmitry Georgievich Fedichkin, Aleksandr Mihailovich Sakharovskii, Valerian Bucikov, Moscalu, Tsygankov

National directorates
First Directorate
 Director: colonel 
 Deputy Director: lieutenant colonel Andrei Glavaciov
 Branch Chiefs: major Ionel Negreanu, captain Mauriciu Adam, captain , captain Aurelian Ionescu
Second Directorate
 Director: colonel Gogu Popescu
 Deputy Director: major Gheorghe Bulz
 Branch Chiefs: captain Ilie Sariceleanu, major Maximilian Vardan, captain Mihai Andriescu
Third Directorate
 Director: major Coman Stoilescu
 Branch Chiefs: captain Augustin Cosma, lieutenant Grigore Filipescu
Fourth Directorate
 Director: major Gheorghe Petrescu
 Deputy Director: captain Cricor Garabețian
 Branch Chiefs: captain Boris Caranicolov, captain Ilarion Savenco, captain Andrei Ciuperge, lieutenant Gheorghe Mihăilescu
Fifth Directorate
 Directors: colonel Mișu Dulgheru, colonel Mircea Lepădătescu
 Deputy Director: lieutenant colonel Simion Tudor Dincă
 Branch Chiefs: captain Matușei Andriescu, captain Grigore Ștețcovici
Sixth Directorate
 Director: lieutenant colonel Augustin Albon
 Deputy Director: major Ion Crișan
 Branch Chiefs: lieutenant Traian Predescu, captain Dionisie Dobre, lieutenant Andrei Tulbure
Seventh Directorate
 Director: lieutenant colonel Alexandru Neacșu
 Branch Chief: major Cornel Goliumbovici
Eighth Directorate
 Deputy Director: major Dumitru Popescu
Ninth Directorate
 Deputy Directors: major Alexandru Guțan (Director of Aiud Prison, 1945–1948), major Nicolae Duță
 Branch Chief: captain Milo Aritonovici
Tenth Directorate
 Director: colonel Alexandru Jurnu
 Deputy Director: major Ion Ceslanschi
 Branch Chief: captain Mihalache Bujor

Regional directorates
Regional Directorate Bucharest
 Director: lieut.-col. Tudor Sepeanu
 Deputy Director: major Moise Senater
 Branch Chiefs: major Avram Solomon, major Dumitru Maxim, captain Vasile Feneșan, major Ștefan Niculescu
 Offices in: Oltenița, Brănești. Căciulați, Buftea, Domnești.
Regional Directorate Brașov
 Director: colonel Iosif Kalbușek
 Deputy Director: major Adalbert Izsák
 Offices in: Zărnești, Codlea, Feldioara.
 County Branch Făgăraș:
 Office in: Arpașu de Jos
 County Branch Odorheiu Secuiesc:
 Offices in: Cristuru Secuiesc, Ocland.
 County Branch Trei Scaune:
 Offices in: Târgu Secuiesc, Covasna, Baraolt.
 County Branch Miercurea Ciuc:
 Offices in: Gheorgheni, Tulgheș, Sânmartin, Lunca de Jos.
Regional Directorate Cluj
 Director: colonel 
 Deputy Director: lieutenant colonel Gheorghe Cuteanu
 Office in: Huedin.
 County Branch Mureș:
 Offices in: Reghin, Sovata, Toplița
 County Branch Turda:
 Chief: captain Mihail Kovács
 Deputy Director: lieutenant Jacob Weigner
 Offices in: Câmpeni, Războieni.
 County Branch Năsăud:
 Chief: major Viorel Gligor
 Deputy Director: lieutenant Andrei Lote
 Offices in: Romuli, Rodna.
 County Branch Someș:
 Chief: major Nicolae Briceag
 Deputy Director: lieutenant Ioan Rusu
 Office in: Gherla.
Regional Directorate Constanța
 Director: captain 
 Deputy Directors: lieutenant Năstase Repi, lieutenant Gheorghe Manolache
 Offices in: Mangalia, Medgidia, Ostrov, Vasile Roaită, Negru Vodă, Cernavodă, Hârșova.
 County Branch Ialomița:
 Chief: captain Ion Iacob
 Deputy Director: lieutenant Dumitru Miu
 Offices in: Urziceni, Slobozia, Fetești.
 County Branch Tulcea:
 Chief: Nicolae Paul
 Offices in: Sulina, Babadag, Isaccea, Măcin, Topolog.
Regional Directorate Craiova
 Director: major Eugen Vistig
 Deputy Director: major Ion Vasilescu
 Offices in: Filiași, Calafat, Băilești.
 County Branch Vâlcea:
 Chief: major Nicolae Filip
 Offices in: Horezu, Călimănești, Drăgășani, Brezoi.
 County Office Gorj:
 Chief: captain Gheorghe Năbădan
 Offices in: Bumbești, Novaci.
 County Branch Mehedinți:
 Chief: captain Ioan Georgescu
 Offices in: Baia de Aramă, Strehaia.
 County Office Romanați:
 Chief: major Ilie Enescu
 Offices in: Corabia, Balș.
Regional Directorate Galați
 Director: colonel 
 Deputy Director: major Gheorghe Babu
 Offices in: Berești, Foltești, Pechea.
 County Branch Putna:
 Offices in: Adjud, Odobești, Panciu, Mărășești, Vizantea, Năruja.
 County Branch Brăila:
 Chief: captain Dumitru Raceu
 Deputy Director: lieutenant Matei Dănilă
 Offices in: Nicolești-Jianu, Făurei, Ianca, Viziru.
 County Branch Râmnicu Sărat:
 Chief: major Nicolae Gabrielescu
 Deputy Directors: lieutenant Alexandru Sichiklev, lieutenant Barel Orenstein
 Offices in: Dumitrești, Găgești, Ciorăști, Boldu.
 County Branch Tecuci:
 Offices in: Ivești, Podu Turcului, Stănilești.
 County Branch Tutova:
 Offices in: Murgeni, Puiești, Ghidigeni.
Regional Directorate Iași
 Director: lieutenant Nicolae Pandelea
 Deputy Director: major Aurel Ceia.
 Offices in: Târgu Frumos, Bivolari. 
 County Branch Neamț: 
 Offices in: Buhuși, Târgu Neamț, Borca, Roman, Băcești. 
 County Branch Bacău: 
 Chief: captain Paul Zelțer
 Offices in: Târgu Ocna, Comănești, Moinești. 
 County Branch Fălciu. 
 County Branch Vaslui.
Regional Directorate Oradea
 Director: lieutenant Ludovic Czeller
 Branch chiefs: captain Toma Elekes, captain Tiberiu Grad, captain Nicolae Drențea, captain Ioan Retezan. 
 Offices in: Beiuș, Salonta, Episcopia Bihorului, Marghita. 
 County Branch Sălaj: 
 Offices in: Carei, Valea lui Mihai, Șimleu Silvaniei. 
 County Branch Satu Mare: 
 Chief: captain Ludovic Weisz
 Office in: Baia Mare. 
 County Branch Maramureș: 
 Chief: captain Alexandru Mureșan
 Office in: Valea Vișeului.
Regional Directorate Pitești
 Director: colonel Mihail Nedelcu
 Deputy Director: major Ioan Marin
 Offices in: Curtea de Argeș, Costești, Stoiceni. 
 County Branch Muscel: 
 Chief: major Mihail Chicoș
 Offices in: Rucăr, Domnești, Topoloveni. 
 County Branch Olt: 
 Chief: captain Ioan Bordei
 Offices in: Drăgănești, Potcoava, Spineni. 
 County Branch Dâmbovița: 
 Chief: captain Ștefan Mănoiu
 Offices in: Pucioasa, Gura Ocniței, Găiești, Răcari, Titu.
Regional Directorate Ploiești
 Director: lieutenant colonel Constantin Câmpeanu
 Deputy Director: major Racovschi Mănescu
 Offices in: Câmpina, Moreni, Sinaia, Bușteni, Predeal, Slănic, Urlați, Văleni, Băicoi. 
 County Branch Buzău: 
 Chief: captain Mihail Holofcov
 Offices in: Pătârlagele,  Mizil, Pogoanele. 
 County Branch Vlașca: 
 Offices in: Vidra, Drăgănești, Pietroșani.
Regional Directorate Sibiu
 Director: lieutenant colonel 
 Deputy Director: captain Lucian Moldor
 Office in: Cisnădie. 
 County Branch Alba: 
 Chief: captain Iacob Popa
 Offices in: Sebeș, Abrud, Aiud. 
 County Branch Hunedoara: 
 Offices in: Petroșani, Lupeni, Simeria, Cugir, Brad, Orăștie, Hațeg. 
 County Branch Târnava-Mică: 
 Chief: captain Iuliu Trapovescu
 Offices in: Târnăveni, Dumbrăveni. 
 County Branch Târnava-Mare: 
 Chief: captain Ion Buzescu
 Offices in: Copșa Mică, Mediaș.
Regional Directorate Suceava
 Director: lieutenant colonel Ioan Popic
 Offices in: Solca, Dărmănești. 
 County Branch Baia: 
 Chief: major Iacob Fuchs
 Offices in: Pașcani, Lespezi. 
 County Branch Botoșani: 
 Chief: captain Israil Ruckerstein
 Offices in: Hârlău, Ștefănești. 
 County Branch Câmpulung Moldovenesc: 
 Chief: captain Dumitru Petru
 Offices in: Vatra Dornei, Gura Humorului, Vama. 
 County Branch Dorohoi: 
 Chief: captain Nicolae Morărescu
 Offices in: Mihăileni, Săveni, Darabani. 
 County Branch Rădăuți: 
 Chief: captain Carol Iludescu
 Office in: Siret.
Regional Directorate Timișoara
 Director: lieutenant colonel 
 Deputy Director: major 
 Offices in: Jimbolia, Lipova, Sânnicolau Mare, Deta, Recaș. 
 County Branch Arad: 
 Chief: major Alexandru Rafila
 Offices in: Sebeș, Curtici, Chișineu-Criș. 
 County Branch Severin: 
 Chief: major Zoltán Kling
 Offices in: Caransebeș, Făget, Orșova, Băile Herculane. 
 County Branch Caraș: 
 Chief: lieutenant Iosif Hahamu
 Offices in: Reșița, Moldova Nouă, Anina.

Notes

References

Securitate officers